Esteban Jorge Velásquez Núñez (born 26 December 1962) is a Chilean teacher and politician who currently serves in the Senate of Chile.

From 2011 to 2013, Velásquez led various strikes in Calama. Although them affected the Chilean economy, he got the attention of the central authorities to respond to needs. With this, he achieved the expansion of avenues, the construction of the Carlos Cisterna Hospital, and the new Cobreloa stadium: the Estadio Zorros del Desierto.

References

External links
 

1962 births
Living people
Chilean people
Party for Democracy (Chile) politicians
Social Green Regionalist Federation politicians
21st-century Chilean politicians
University of Tarapacá alumni
People from El Loa Province
Senators of the LVI Legislative Period of the National Congress of Chile